Uglovo is a rural locality (a selo) in Valuysky District, Belgorod Oblast, Russia. The population was 64 as of 2010. There are 2 streets.

Geography 
Uglovo is located 24 km northwest of Valuyki (the district's administrative centre) by road. Timonovo is the nearest rural locality.

References 

Rural localities in Valuysky District